Collagen, type II, alpha 1 (primary osteoarthritis, spondyloepiphyseal dysplasia, congenital), also known as COL2A1, is a human gene that provides instructions for the production of the pro-alpha1(II) chain of type II collagen.

Function 

This gene encodes the alpha-1 chain of type II collagen, a fibrillar collagen found in cartilage and the vitreous humor of the eye. Mutations in this gene are associated with achondrogenesis, chondrodysplasia, early onset familial osteoarthritis, SED congenita, Langer-Saldino achondrogenesis, Kniest dysplasia, Stickler syndrome type I, and spondyloepimetaphyseal dysplasia Strudwick type. In addition, defects in processing chondrocalcin, a calcium binding protein that is the C-propeptide of this collagen molecule, are also associated with chondrodysplasia. There are two transcripts identified for this gene.
Type II collagen, which adds structure and strength to connective tissues, is found primarily in cartilage, the jelly-like substance that fills the eyeball (the vitreous), the inner ear, and the center portion of the discs between the vertebrae in the spine (nucleus pulposus). Three pro-alpha1(II) chains twist together to form a triple-stranded, ropelike procollagen molecule. These procollagen molecules must be processed by enzymes in the cell. Once these molecules are processed, they leave the cell and arrange themselves into long, thin fibrils that cross-link to one another in the spaces around cells. The cross-linkages result in the formation of very strong mature type II collagen fibers.

The COL2A1 gene is located on the long (q) arm of chromosome 12 between positions 13.11 and 13.2, from base pair 46,653,017 to base pair 46,684,527.

Related conditions
 Achondrogenesis type 2: Several kinds of mutations in the COL2A1 gene are responsible for achondrogenesis, type 2. These mutations may include missing pieces of the COL2A1 gene, substitution of the amino acid building-block glycine with another amino acid, or changes that cause important parts of the protein to be left out. All of these mutations prevent the normal production of mature type II collagen, which results in achondrogenesis, type 2 by affecting tissues that are rich in type II collagen.
Platyspondylic lethal skeletal dysplasia, Torrance type:Fewer than 10 mutations in the COL2A1 gene have been identified in people with platyspondylic lethal skeletal dysplasia, Torrance type. Most of these mutations change a single protein building block (amino acid) in the pro-alpha1(II) chain. These COL2A1 mutations lead to the production of an abnormal version of the pro-alpha1(II) chain that cannot be incorporated into type II collagen fibers. As a result, cells make a reduced amount of type II collagen. Instead of forming collagen molecules, the abnormal pro-alpha1(II) chains build up in cartilage cells (chondrocytes). These changes disrupt normal bone development, resulting in skeletal abnormalities such as short arms and legs, a small chest, flattened vertebrae, and short fingers and toes.
 Hypochondrogenesis: Several different types of mutations in the COL2A1 gene are responsible for hypochondrogenesis. These mutations may include missing pieces of the COL2A1 gene, the substitution of the building-block amino acid glycine with another amino acid, or changes that leave out important parts of the protein. All of these changes interfere with the formation of mature triple-stranded type II collagen molecules, which results in this type of hypochondrogenesis by affecting tissues that are rich in type II collagen.
 Kniest dysplasia: Most of the mutations responsible for Kniest dysplasia cause abnormally short pro-alpha1(II) collagen chains to be produced in the cell. These short chains join with longer, normal-length collagen chains. The resulting abnormal type II collagen molecules are shorter than normal, causing the signs and symptoms of Kniest dysplasia.
 Spondyloepimetaphyseal dysplasia, Strudwick type: All of the mutations in the COL2A1 gene characterized to date cause an amino acid switch in the pro-alpha1(II) chain of type II collagen; specifically, the amino acid glycine is replaced by a different amino acid. The substitution of another amino acid for glycine in this chain inhibits the formation of stable, triple-stranded, ropelike collagen molecules. This results in spondyloepimetaphyseal dysplasia, Strudwick type by affecting tissues that are rich in type II collagen.
 Spondyloepiphyseal dysplasia congenita: Spondyloepimetaphyseal dysplasia congenita can be caused by several types of mutations in the COL2A1 gene. These mutations may result in the incorrect substitution of an amino acid in the pro-alpha1(II) chain or the production of an abnormally short pro-alpha1(II) chain. All of these changes interfere with the formation of mature triple-stranded type II collagen molecules, which results in this type of spondyloepimetaphyseal dysplasia congenita by affecting tissues that are rich in type II collagen.
 Spondyloperipheral dysplasia: Mutations that cause spondyloperipheral dysplasia lead to the production of an abnormally short pro-alpha1(II) chain that cannot be incorporated into type II collagen fibers. As a result, cells make a reduced amount of type II collagen. Instead of forming collagen molecules, the abnormal pro-alpha1(II) chains build up in cartilage cells (chondrocytes). These changes disrupt normal bone development, resulting in flattened vertebrae, short fingers and toes, and the other features of spondyloperipheral dysplasia.
Stickler syndrome: Several of the mutations in the COL2A1 gene result in the production of an abnormally short protein that cannot be incorporated into a type II collagen fiber. Most of the mutations in COL2A1 that cause Stickler syndrome, however, have a premature stop signal in one copy of the gene. Because of this, cells produce only half of the normal amount of pro-alpha 1(II) collagen chains. This shortage results in underproduction of type II collagen in cartilage, causing the symptoms of Stickler syndrome, COL2A1.
 Other disorders with an increased risk from variations of the COL2A1 gene: Variations in the COL2A1 gene may increase the risk of developing osteoarthritis (OA), a degenerative disease of joint cartilage, in some people. The variations in this gene result in amino acid changes in the pro-alpha1(II) chain of type II collagen. These changes in the collagen fibers of the joints are thought to play a role in the wearing down of joint cartilage, resulting in the signs and symptoms of osteoarthritis.

References

Further reading

External links 
  GeneReviews/NCBI/NIH/UW entry on Stickler Syndrome
 COL2A1 at Genetics Home Reference
 small deletion defects
 nucleotide substitutions
 Definition of COL2A1
 GeneCard